Dowli Khanvan (also Romanized as Dowlī Khānvān) is a village in Baryaji Rural District, in the Central District of Sardasht County, West Azerbaijan Province, Iran. At the 2006 census, its population was 253, in 47 families.

References 

Populated places in Sardasht County